The 1986 season of the Venezuelan Primera División, the top category of Venezuelan football, was played by 11 teams. The national champions were Unión Atlético Táchira.

Results

Oriental Group

Occidental Group

Final Stage

External links
Venezuela 1986 season at RSSSF

Ven
Venezuelan Primera División seasons
Prim